Thomas Némouthé (born 16 January 2001) is a professional footballer who plays as a midfielder for Championnat National 2 club Créteil. Born in metropolitan France, he plays for the French Guiana national team.

Club career 
Némouthé made his professional debut for Paris FC in a 1–0 Coupe de France win over Le Havre on 19 January 2021. He would make one further cup appearance for the club before signing for Créteil on a free transfer at the end of the season.

International career 
Némouthé made his debut for French Guiana in a 3–1 friendly win over Suriname on 22 May 2022.

International goals

References

External links 
 
 

2001 births
Living people
French footballers
People from Le Blanc-Mesnil
French Guiana international footballers
French people of French Guianan descent
Association football midfielders
Championnat National 3 players
Championnat National players

JA Drancy players
Paris FC players
US Créteil-Lusitanos players